Liotipoma solaris is a species of small sea snail with calcareous opercula, a marine gastropod mollusc in the family Colloniidae.

Description
The shell grows to a height of 4 mm.

Distribution
This marine species occurs off the Fiji Islands and Papua New Guinea, in coral reefs.

References

External links
 To World Register of Marine Species
 

Colloniidae
Gastropods described in 2012